Ernő Verebes (born Ernst Weiss, December 6, 1902 – June 13, 1971) was a Hungarian-American actor who began his career in Hungarian silent films in 1915. During his film career he worked and lived in Hungary, Germany and in the United States. He was born into a Hungarian emigrant family in New York, but his family later returned to Austria-Hungary.

Verebes was successful in Germany during the 1920s and early 1930s, often appearing in elegant and comedic roles. The Jewish actor had to leave Germany after the Nazi Party got into power. He returned to the United States in the late 1930s, but had to content himself with mostly small roles. He retired in 1953 after more than 140 films.

Selected filmography
In Europe:

 Romlott emberek között (1915)
 Mire megvénülünk (1917) - Áronffy Dezsõ as a boy
 Oliver Twist (1919) - First thief
 Három pár facipö (1920)
 Tamás úrfi kalandjai (1920)
 Az ötödik osztály (1920) - Bill
 Péntek este (1921) - Rabbi's son
 Lúdas Matyi (1922) - Lúdas Matyi
 A 3 pofon (1923)
 Holnap kezdödik az élet (1924) - Barna
 A Pál-utcai fiúk (1925) - Boka János
 Countess Maritza (1925) - Baron Koloman Zsupan
 Der Mann im Sattel (1925) - Mann im Sattel
 Should We Be Silent? (1926) - Gerd
 Torments of the Night (1926) - Kurt Elversam
 The Woman in Gold (1926)
 Harry Hill auf Welle 1000 (1926)
 The Third Squadron (1926) - Leutnant Edler
 The Blue Danube (1926) - Graf Rudi Zirsky
 The Violet Eater (1926) - Bobby Sterzl
 Les voleurs de gloire (1926) - Georges Lenoir
 Fadette (1926) - Sylvaine
 Unmarried Daughters (1926) - Heidemann
 Tragedy of a Marriage (1927)
 The Gypsy Baron (1927) - Graf Ottokar
 The Eighteen Year Old (1927) - Gaston Ravel
 The Queen Was in the Parlour (1927) - Adjudant der Königin
 Todessturz im Zirkus Cesarelli (1927)
 Bigamie (1927) - Tänzer Fred
 Was die Kinder ihren Eltern verschweigen (1927)
 Ghost Train (1927) - Richard Winthrop
 The Beggar Student (1927) - Jan, Student
 Im Luxuszug (1927) - Manuel
 A hetedik fátyol (1927)
 Majestät schneidet Bubiköpfe (1928)
 Six Girls and a Room for the Night (1928)
 Who Invented Divorce? (1928)
 The Gallant Hussar (1928) - Bubenyik
 Kaczmarek (1928)
 Rich, Young and Beautiful (1928) - Emanuel, ein Mathematiker
 Serenissimus and the Last Virgin (1928) - Bob, Tanz-Adjutant
 Der moderne Casanova (1928)
 Die lustigen Vagabunden (1928) - August Fliederbusch, Landstreicher
 The Circus Princess (1929)
 The Gypsy Chief (1929)
 A Pál -utcai fúk (1929)
 The Black Domino (1929) - Juliano
 Crucified Girl (1929)
 Land Without Women (1929) - O'Donegan - goldminer in Coolgardie
 Queen of Fashion (1929) - Leo Sanders
 Kameradschaftsehe (1929)
 My Daughter's Tutor (1930)
 Kamarádské manzelství (1930) - Jirí Havelka
 Danube Waltz (1930) - Ognatz Stössl - pianist
 Delicatessen (1930)
 The Great Longing (1930) - Himself, Ernst Verebes
 Die Jagd nach der Million (1930) - Carlos
 A Tango for You (1930) - Alfonso di Bei Juanos, Tangokapellmeister
 Die Csikosbaroneß (1930) - Leutnant Graf Kövesi
 Va Banque (1930) - Reporter Freddy Kallai
 The Song Is Ended (1930) - Jerome Toenli
 Retreat on the Rhine (1930) - Max Hoffmann, Kapellmeister
 Tingel-Tangel (1930) - Billie
 Petit officier... Adieu! (1930) - Tönli
 People on Sunday (1930) - Himself
 Madame Pompadour (1931) - Marcel de Clermount, Kadett
 Die Faschingsfee (1931) - Alfred v. Mützelburg
 Der Tanzhusar (1931) - Józsi Ballok, Leutnant Husaren-Regiment Nr. 3
 Once I Loved a Girl in Vienna (1931) - Imre von Kövesháza - Fähnrich
 Walzerparadies (1931) - Der Klavierspieler
 When the Soldiers (1931) - Franzl - Militärmusikant
 Das Geheimnis der roten Katze (1931) - André Dupont, Schauspieler
 Um eine Nasenlänge (1931) - Teddy, ein Mixer
  (1931) - Leutnant Ferry von Werthern
 My Heart Longs for Love (1931) - Fritz Heberlein
 Everyone Asks for Erika (1931) - Otto Rebes - Redakteur
 Victoria and Her Hussar (1931) - Jancyi, Koltays Bursche
 Things Are Getting Better Already (1932) - Willi Bertram
 The Company's in Love (1932) - Heinrich Pulver - Regieassist.
 Two in a Car (1932)
 Once There Was a Waltz (1932) - Gustl Linzer
 All is at Stake (1932)
 Countess Mariza (1932) - Koloman Zsupan
 Traum von Schönbrunn (1932) - Lieutenant
 The Blue of Heaven (1932) - Der flotte Hugo
 The Flower of Hawaii (1933) - Buffy, Sekretär
 Es war einmal ein Musikus (1933) - Rolf, Student, Heinz's Freund
 A Night in Venice (1934) - Dr. Kovács Jenõ
 Helyet az öregeknek (1934) - Feri, Polgár fia
 Ende schlecht, alles gut (1934) - Viktor's brother Ferry
 Villa for Sale (1935) - Hódy György
 Little Mother (1935) - Servant
 Viereinhalb Musketiere (1935) - Fritz Koerner, violinist
 Catherine the Last (1936) - Tobby, Hans' servant
 Szenzáció (1936) - Riporter (Keretjáték)
 Hochzeitsreise zu 50% (1937) - Paul Kerekes

In America:

A Desperate Adventure (1938) - Marcel
Hotel Imperial (1939) - Ivan (uncredited)
The Magnificent Fraud (1939) - Castro - Night Club M.C. (uncredited)
Balalaika (1939) - Danchenoff's Secretary (uncredited)
Dance, Girl, Dance (1940) - Fitch
Bitter Sweet (1940) - Orderly (uncredited)
Underground (1941) - Maxel's Headwaiter (uncredited)
New Wine (1941) - Karl (uncredited)
To Be or Not to Be (1942) - Stage Manager (uncredited)
Moonlight Masquerade (1942) - Count Eric Nordvig
Desperate Journey (1942) - German Sergeant (uncredited)
Above Suspicion (1943) - Gestapo Officer (uncredited)
The Strange Death of Adolf Hitler (1943) - Count Godeck
None Shall Escape (1944) - Court Clerk (uncredited)
The Hitler Gang (1944) - Anton Drexler
The Conspirators (1944) - Cascais Fisherman (uncredited)
The Climax (1944) - Brunn
You Came Along (1945) - 400 Club Headwaiter (uncredited)
Shady Lady (1945) - Proprietor (uncredited)
Gilda (1946) - Blackjack Dealer (uncredited)
Tangier (1946) - Capt. Cartiaz
Easy Come, Easy Go (1947) - Mopsy Marek (uncredited)
Calcutta (1947) - Frenchman (uncredited)
Dear Ruth (1947) - Headwaiter (uncredited)
Northwest Outpost (1947) - Kyril Balinin's Aide
The Perils of Pauline (1947) - Drawing Room Set Director (uncredited)
Where There's Life (1947) - Peter Gornics
The Big Clock (1948) - Waiter
My Own True Love (1948) - Captain of Waiters (uncredited)
Alias Nick Beal (1949) - Mr. Cox - Tailor
Outpost in Morocco (1949) - Bamboule
The Great Sinner (1949) - Hotel Valet
Scene of the Crime (1949) - Wine Steward (uncredited)
Red, Hot and Blue (1949) - Waiter
My Friend Irma (1949) - Mr. Ubang
The Great Lover (1949) - Waiter (uncredited)
Captain Carey, U.S.A. (1949) - Detective
Copper Canyon (1950) - Professor
Appointment with Danger (1950) - Window Dresser (uncredited)
Where Danger Lives (1950) - Waiter (uncredited)
I'll Get By (1950) - Waiter (uncredited)
The Goldbergs (1950) - Mr. Mendell
His Kind of Woman (1951) - Esteban - Morro Servant (uncredited)
Too Young to Kiss (1951) - Headwaiter (uncredited)
O. Henry's Full House (1952) - Waiter (segment "The Cop and the Anthem") (uncredited)
The Merry Widow (1952) - Waiter (uncredited)
Stars and Stripes Forever (1952) - Organ Grinder (uncredited)
Call Me Madam (1953) - Music Clerk (uncredited)
Scared Stiff (1953) - Headwaiter (uncredited)
The Juggler (1953) - Official (uncredited)
Remains to Be Seen (1953) - Waiter (uncredited)
Houdini (1953) - Prof. Allegari (uncredited) (final film role)

References

External links 

 
 
 Ernő Verebes at Virtual History

1902 births
1971 deaths
Male actors from New York City
American male film actors
American male silent film actors
Hungarian male film actors
Hungarian male silent film actors
Hungarian emigrants to the United States
20th-century Hungarian male actors
20th-century American male actors
Jewish American male actors
Jewish Hungarian actors
20th-century American Jews